Established in 1968, the GEMS Our Own English High School (OOEHS) – Dubai, is one of the oldest schools in the UAE. 

It was the first school established by K. S. Varkey and his wife, Mariama Varkey. The school is now managed by GEMS Education founded by their son, Sunny Varkey.

The first campus opened in Bastakia and moved to Oud Metha in 1983. The School moved once again to its current location Al Warqa'a. Initially the girls and boys attended the same campus during different times of day; the girls were in the morning  and the boys were in the afternoon. When the male students moved to a new campus in Al Warqa’a in 2007, the girls and boys school split into separate campuses. 
The girls school moved to Al Warqa in 2012.

Other branches
This school is a subsidiary of GEMS Education

Our Own English High School, Al Ain
Our Own English High School, Fujairah
Our Own English High School, Sharjah
Our Own English High School, Ras al-Khaimah

Campus

Established in 1968, GEMS Our Own English High School, Dubai has over 13,000 students of 22 nationalities, and 2,000 faculty members from 10 countries.

Notable alumni
 Adhitya, Actor
 Anjali Menon, Film maker
 Roshni Chopra
 Naeemuddin Aslam, Sportsman
 Nazriya Nazim, Actor
 Keba Jeremiah, Musician
 Parvatii Nair, Model
 Aayan Afzal Khan, Cricketer

References

External links
OOEHS Dubai website

Educational institutions established in 1968
Education in the United Arab Emirates
Education in Dubai
Indian international schools in the United Arab Emirates
GEMS schools